Brian Patrick Stablein (born April 14, 1970) is a former American football wide receiver in the National Football League.

Early years
Stablein played high school football at McDowell High School in Erie, Pennsylvania. He was a walk-on to the Ohio State Buckeyes football team in 1988.  He earned a scholarship in 1990 with the Ohio State Buckeyes.

Professional career

Denver Broncos
He was drafted by the Denver Broncos in the 8th round of the 1993 NFL Draft. On August 22, 1993, he was waived along with 11 other players.

Cincinnati Bengals
On August 25, 1993, he was claimed off of waivers by the Cincinnati Bengals. He was waived by the Bengals on August 31, 1993.

Indianapolis Colts
From 1994 to 1997, Stablein played four seasons with the Indianapolis Colts, where he caught 51 passes for 540 yards and caught 2 touchdown passes.

New England Patriots
On March 19, 1998, he signed a three-year contract with the New England Patriots, and was projected to replace the departed Dave Meggett on returns. In 5 exhibition games with the team, he caught two passes for 19 yards and fair caught his only 2 punt return attempts. He was waived on August 31, 1998.

Detroit Lions
On September 1, 1998, he signed with the Detroit Lions, where he played from 1998 to 2000, catching 26 passes for 252 yards and one touchdown.

References

External links
Databasefootball

1970 births
Living people
Sportspeople from Erie, Pennsylvania
Players of American football from Pennsylvania
American football wide receivers
Ohio State Buckeyes football players
Indianapolis Colts players
Detroit Lions players